Jonathan Robin Blanning Gough (born 1962) is a British Anglican priest and former military chaplain. Since March 2019, he has served as the Archdeacon of Richmond and Craven in the Diocese of Leeds. He had previously served in the Royal Army Chaplains' Department of the British Army.

Personal life
Gough was born in 1962 and was brought up in rural Devon, England. He was educated at Exeter School, the an all-boys private school. He studied at St David's University College, University of Wales, and graduated with a Bachelor of Arts (BA Hons) degree in 1983. He then matriculated into St Stephen's House, Oxford, an Anglo-Catholic theological college, to train for ordination between 1983 and 1985. He continued his academic studies and graduated from Westminster College, Oxford with a Master of Theology (MTh) degree in 1996.

Ordained ministry
Gough was ordained in the Church of England as a deacon in 1985 and as a priest in 1986. He went on to serve in the Royal Army Chaplains' Department, British Army from 1989 to 2019: between 2001 and 2005, he took a break from the military to work as the Archbishop of Canterbury's Secretary for Ecumenism. He saw active service in Northern Ireland, Bosnia (UN Protection Force and NATO Stabilisation Force), Kosovo (NATO Kosovo Force), and Afghanistan. He was chaplain to the Royal Military Academy Sandhurst from 2009 to 2011. In 2017, he was promoted to the rank of chaplain to the forces 1st class (equivalent to colonel), and appointed an assistant chaplain general. He retired from the British Army on 3 May 2019.

In December 2018, Gough was announced as the next Archdeacon of Richmond and Craven in the Diocese of Leeds, in succession to Bev Mason. He was installed as archdeacon during a service at Ripon Cathedral on 10 March 2019. He has also been warden of readers for the Diocese of Leeds since 2019.

Gough is a member of the Society of Catholic Priests (SCP), a liberal Anglo-Catholic society of clergy. He is also a member of the Society of the Resurrection, a group associated with the Community of the Resurrection.

References

1962 births
Living people
Royal Army Chaplains' Department officers
British military personnel of The Troubles (Northern Ireland)
British Army personnel of the War in Afghanistan (2001–2021)
20th-century English Anglican priests
21st-century English Anglican priests
Archdeacons of Richmond
People educated at Exeter School
Alumni of the University of Wales, Lampeter
Alumni of St Stephen's House, Oxford
Alumni of Westminster College, Oxford